DNA-(apurinic or apyrimidinic site) lyase is an enzyme that in humans is encoded by the APEX1 gene.

Apurinic/apyrimidinic (AP) sites (also called "abasic sites") occur frequently in DNA molecules by spontaneous hydrolysis, by DNA damaging agents or by DNA glycosylases that remove specific abnormal bases. AP sites are pre-mutagenic lesions that can prevent normal DNA replication. All cells, from simple prokaryotes to humans, have evolved systems to identify and repair such sites. Class II AP endonucleases cleave the phosphodiester backbone 5' to the AP site, thereby initiating a process known as base excision repair (BER). The APEX gene (alternatively named APE1, HAP1, APEN) encodes the major AP endonuclease in human cells. Splice variants have been found for this gene; all encode the same protein.

Interactions 

APEX1 has been shown to interact with MUTYH, Flap structure-specific endonuclease 1 and XRCC1.

Aging

Deficiency of APEX1 causes accummulation of DNA damage leading to both cellular senescence and features of premature aging.  This finding is consistent with the theory that DNA damage is a primary cause of aging.

References

Further reading

External links